La Raza Studies may refer to:

 La Raza
 Chican@ Studies
 Latin American Studies